Anelaphus inflaticollis is a species of beetle in the family Cerambycidae. It was described by Chemsak in 1959.

References

Anelaphus
Beetles described in 1959